Albert Howe Lybyer (1876 in Putnamville, Indiana – 1949) was a scholar of the history of the Middle East and the Balkans. Lybyer taught medieval and modern European history at Oberlin College from 1909 to 1913, and also held teaching positions at Robert College of Istanbul (1900–1906), Harvard University (1907–1909) and the University of Illinois (1913–1944). He served as a technical advisor to the King–Crane Commission in 1919.

The book The Government of the Ottoman Empire in the Time of Suleiman the Magnificent was his most influential work.

He gave manuscript feedback to Barnette Miller for her 1931 book Beyond the Sublime Porte on the Turkish seraglio.

He graduated from Princeton University and Harvard University.

References

 Oberlin College Archives | Holdings | Finding Guides | RG 30/314 - Albert Lybyer (1879-1949) | Biography

1876 births
1949 deaths
American medievalists
Scholars of Ottoman history
People from Putnam County, Indiana
Oberlin College faculty
Harvard University faculty
University of Illinois faculty
Princeton University alumni
Harvard University alumni
American expatriates in the Ottoman Empire